Adama Science and Technology University
Assam Science and Technology University
Astrakhan State Technical University